The Tscheischhorn is a mountain of the Oberhalbstein Alps, overlooking Juf in Graubünden, Switzerland.

References

External links
 Tscheischhorn on Hikr

Mountains of the Alps
Alpine three-thousanders
Mountains of Graubünden
Mountains of Switzerland
Avers